Angus Tarnawsky is an Australian artist and musician. He was awarded a Bachelor of Music Performance (Honours) from the Victorian College of the Arts in 2009, specializing in electro-acoustic improvisation. He relocated from Melbourne to Brooklyn, New York in 2010 to join the motorik influenced rock band, Apache Beat. He currently lives and works in Canada. As a solo artist, he creates electro-acoustic/electronic music and exhibits sound installations. In 2014, his debut EP was released by the Berlin-based record label Inner Surface Music. That same year the Melbourne Next Wave Festival premiered his first installation project "Artifacts," with pianist Nathan Liow. He has collaborated on a wide range of projects, including work with visual artist, Stanislava Pinchuk, musician Brian Chase, and choreographer Duane Cyrus. He is also the curator of the experimental record label In Context Music.

Between 2015 and 2017 he was the drummer and recording engineer for the punk band Flowers of Evil, recording two full-length albums. As a session drummer he has toured and recorded with various artists including Crocodiles, Haunted Hearts, Devin Therriault, Temples, Au.Ra, Cleopold, Splashh, and Ballet School.

References

Australian musicians
Living people
1988 births